Eugene Aram (170416 August 1759) was an English philologist, but also infamous as the murderer celebrated by Thomas Hood in his ballad The Dream of Eugene Aram, and by Edward Bulwer-Lytton in his 1832 novel Eugene Aram.

Early life
Aram was born in 1704 to humble parents at Ramsgill in the West Riding of Yorkshire. His father was a gardener on the Newby Hall estate, owned by Sir Edward Blackett. His father had a good knowledge of botany and horticulture.

He had a "fair school education": reading and arithmetic. At 13 he started working with his father on the Newby estate. Sir Edward allowed him to make use of his library and he taught himself Latin and Greek. In 1720 he went to work as a book-keeper in a counting house in London run by Christopher Blackett, a relative of Sir Edward. Unfortunately he contracted smallpox in London, and became very ill. He decided to return to Yorkshire and found a post as a school teacher in the small village of Netherdale.

Whilst still young, he married "unfortunately" (a term then used for getting a girl pregnant before marriage) and settled as a schoolmaster at Netherdale, and during the years he spent there, he taught himself Hebrew.

In 1734 he moved to Knaresborough, where he remained as schoolmaster till 1744. In that year a man named Daniel Clark, a shoemaker in Knaresborough, and an intimate friend of Aram, was rumoured to have come into money through his wife. Aram discussed this with a friend Richard Houseman. They told Clark to start purchasing items on credit, as local shopkeepers knew of his sudden wealth. The shoemaker followed this advice and built up debts exceeding his capital.

Then, after obtaining a considerable quantity of goods from some of the tradesmen in the town, and rumours starting to spread that he could not repay the debts, Clark suddenly disappeared on 8 February 1744. The goods included jewellery and silver plates, and were of quite high value. It was first thought he had run off to escape his debts or to sell the goods. Soon after, Eugene began clearing all his own debts. Neighbours commented on his new-found wealth and on the additional absence of Richard Houseman. In April 1744 Eugene left town and went back to London where he began teaching French.

Suspicions of being concerned in this swindling transaction fell upon Aram. His garden was searched, and some of the goods found there. However, there was not sufficient evidence to convict him of any crime, he was discharged, and soon after set out for London, leaving his wife behind. In London he found employment as an usher in a school at Piccadilly and learned the Syriac language, Chaldee (Aramaic) and Arabic.

Travels
For several years he travelled through parts of England, acting as usher in a number of schools, and settled eventually at the Grammar School at King's Lynn, in Norfolk. During his travels he had amassed considerable materials for a work he had projected on etymology, entitled A Comparative Lexicon of the English, Latin, Greek, Hebrew and Celtic Languages. He was undoubtedly a pioneer in the field of philology, who realised, what was then not yet admitted by scholars, the affinity of the Celtic language to the other languages in Europe, and could dispute the then accepted belief that Latin was derived from Greek.

Aram's writings show that he had grasped the right idea on the subject of the Indo-European character of the Celtic languages, which was not established until James Cowles Prichard published his book, Eastern Origin of the Celtic Traditions, in 1831.

By 1758 he was living in King's Lynn.

Trial
In February 1758 a skeleton was dug up at Thistle Hill in Knaresborough, while men were digging to find stone for building. Suspicion arose that it might be Clark's body. Aram's wife was interviewed and said she thought it was Clark and heavily implied that her husband Eugene may have been involved, having spent much time with Clark and also gave the name of Richard Houseman as a possible accomplice.

Houseman was found and questioned and confronted with the bones that had been found. He protested his innocence and, taking up one of the bones, said, "This is no more Dan Clark's bone than it is mine." His manner in saying this roused suspicion that he knew more of Clark's disappearance. When questioned, he contested that he had been present at the murder of Clark by him and another man, Terry, of whom nothing further is heard. Houseman's answers however indicated that the reason he knew the skeleton was not Daniel Clark was because he knew where Clark was in fact buried. On being pressed he gave information as to the place where the body had been buried in St Robert's Cave, a well-known spot near Knaresborough. He also said that Aram had killed him. 

Aram had made no attempt to change his name and was tracked down in the school at King's Lynn and arrested on 21 August 1758. He was sent to York and held at Tyburn Prison. Houseman's testimony was admitted as evidence against him. The trial did not begin until 3 August 1759 at York County Court.

Aram conducted his own defence, and did not attempt to overthrow Houseman's evidence, though there were some discrepancies in that; but made a skilful attack on the fallibility of circumstantial evidence in general, and particularly of evidence drawn from the discovery of unidentifiable bones. He brought forward several instances where bones had been found in caves, and tried to show that the bones found at St Robert's Cave were probably those of some hermit who had taken up his abode there. He correctly pointed out that they had misidentified the first skeleton found, so the second body might equally be anybody.

He claimed that Clark had given him several items for safekeeping - which was certainly possible. However, Houseman claimed to have witnessed Aram kill Clark as they walked to the cave, and this evidence was damning. He said they had split Clark's goods. Houseman had buried the items in his garden.

Mrs Aram said she found her husband burning clothes in the garden on the day after Clark's disappearance.

Death
He was found guilty, and condemned to be executed on 6 August 1759, three days after his trial. While in his cell he confessed his guilt, and threw new light on the motives for his crime, by asserting that he had discovered an affair between Clark and his own wife. On the night before his execution he made an unsuccessful attempt at suicide by opening the veins in his arm with a straight razor.

Eugene Aram was hanged at York's Tyburn in an area of the Knavesmire on 16 August 1759. His skull is preserved in King's Lynn museum.

Aram in literature

In Frances Hodgson Burnett's memoir The One I knew the Best of All, Burnett mentions Eugene Aram while describing her own guilty feeling after hiding a parkin (cake) in the cupboard as a child. She says, "[I] was an infant Eugene Aram, and the body of [my] victim was mouldering in the very house with [me]."

Thomas Hood's ballad, The Dream of Eugene Aram centres on Aram's activity as a schoolteacher, contrasting his scholarship with his hidden murderous urges. Bulwer-Lytton's novel Eugene Aram creates a Romantic figure torn between violence and visionary ideals, an image that is also portrayed in W. G. Wills's play Eugene Aram, in which Henry Irving took the principal role.

Eugene Aram is also referenced in the third to last stanza of George Orwell's 1935 poem "A Happy Vicar I Might Have Been".

P. G. Wodehouse, in several of his fictional works, references Eugene Aram, and often quotes from the last two lines of Hood's poem: "And Eugene Aram walk'd between, / With gyves upon his wrist."

In Chapter 21 of his 1905 novel The Head of Kay's, when the hero Fenn loses his school cap in a possibly incriminating situation, he relates, upon its reappearance, that: 
In the 1916 story Jeeves Takes Charge, Bertie Wooster, who has stolen his uncle's manuscript memoir and is worried about hiding it, recalls:

Note: the phrase 'I slew him', does not occur in Hood's poem.

Bill the Conqueror, published in 1924, contains the reference "It was with all the depression of a Eugene Aram that he strode from the pond and buried himself in a quiet, leafy by-way."

In 1929's Summer Lightning, Ronnie Fish is compared to Aram: 

In Chapter 8 of his 1946 novel Joy in the Morning, Bertie recalls: 

In Chapter 6 of the 1954 novel Jeeves and the Feudal Spirit (American title: Bertie Wooster Sees it Through) after being hauled before the Vinton Street Magistrate, Bertie tells his valet: 

Eugene Aram is also referenced in the eighth chapter of E. Phillips Oppenheim's novel, The Great Impersonation:

Eugene Aram is mentioned by Dr. Thorndyke in Chapter 11 of the R. Austin Freeman 1911 novel The Eye of Osiris, where Thorndyke expounds on the difficulty of disposing of the human body:

Eugene Aram is also referenced in Chapter 6 of the 1947 novel Love Among the Ruins by Angela Thirkell : "at which Mr. Marling went so purple in the face that his wife and son, closing in on him, walked him away like Eugene Aram."

See also
 Edward H. Rulloff, another philologist-murderer

References

Attribution:
 

1704 births
1759 deaths
1745 crimes
English philologists
People from Nidderdale
English people convicted of murder
People convicted of murder by England and Wales
Executed people from North Yorkshire
People executed by England and Wales by hanging
People executed for murder
Schoolteachers from Yorkshire
Criminals from Yorkshire